James Douglas Morrison (December 8, 1943 – July 3, 1971) was an American singer, poet and songwriter who was the lead vocalist of the rock band the Doors. Due to his wild personality, poetic lyrics, distinctive voice, unpredictable and erratic performances, and the dramatic circumstances surrounding his life and early death, Morrison is regarded by music critics and fans as one of the most influential frontmen in rock history. Since his death, Morrison's fame has endured as one of popular culture's top rebellious and oft-displayed icons, representing the generation gap and youth counterculture.

Together with pianist Ray Manzarek, Morrison founded the Doors in 1965 in Venice, California. The group spent two years in obscurity until shooting to prominence with their number-one single in the United States, "Light My Fire", taken from their self-titled debut album. Morrison recorded a total of six studio albums with the Doors, all of which sold well and received critical acclaim. He was well known for improvising spoken word poetry passages while the band played live. Manzarek said Morrison "embodied hippie counterculture rebellion".

Morrison developed an alcohol dependency throughout the band's career, which at times affected his performances on stage. On July 3, 1971, Morrison died unexpectedly in Paris at the age of 27, amid several conflicting witness reports. His premature death is often linked with the 27 Club. Since no autopsy was performed, the cause of Morrison's death remains disputed.

Although the Doors recorded two more albums after Morrison died, his death severely affected the band's fortunes, and they split up two years later. In 1993, Morrison was inducted into the Rock and Roll Hall of Fame along with the other Doors members. In 2011, a Rolling Stone readers' pick placed Morrison in fifth position on the magazine's "Best Lead Singers of All Time", and in another Rolling Stone list of "The 100 Greatest Singers of All Time", he was ranked 47th. He was also ranked the 22nd greatest singer in rock by Classic Rock magazine.

Biography

1943–1961: Early years 
James Douglas Morrison was born on December 8, 1943 in Melbourne, Florida, to Clara Virginia (née Clarke; 1919–2005) and Lt.(j.g.) George Stephen Morrison (1919–2008), a future rear admiral in the United States Navy. His ancestors were Scottish, Irish, and English. Admiral Morrison commanded U.S. naval forces during the Gulf of Tonkin incident in August 1964, which provided the pretext for the U.S. involvement in the Vietnam War in 1965. Morrison had a younger sister, Anne Robin (born 1947 in Albuquerque, New Mexico), and a younger brother, Andrew Lee Morrison (born 1948 in Los Altos, California).

In 1947, when he was three to four years old, Morrison allegedly witnessed a car accident in the desert, during which a truck overturned and some Native Americans were lying injured on the side of the road. He referred to this incident in the Doors' song "Peace Frog" on their 1970 album Morrison Hotel, as well as in the spoken word performances "Dawn's Highway" and "Ghost Song" on the posthumous 1978 album An American Prayer. Morrison believed this incident to be the most formative event of his life, and made repeated references to it in the imagery in his songs, poems, and interviews. Morrison believed the spirits or the ghosts of those "dead Indians leapt into [his] soul," and that he was "like a sponge, ready to sit there and absorb it."

Morrison's family does not recall this traffic incident happening in the way he told it. According to the Morrison biography No One Here Gets Out Alive, his family did drive past a car accident on an Indian reservation when he was a child, and he was very upset by it. The book The Doors, written by the surviving members of the band, explains how different Morrison's account of the incident was from that of his father, who is quoted as saying, "We went by several Indians. It did make an impression on him. He always thought about that crying Indian." This is contrasted sharply with Morrison's tale of "Indians scattered all over the highway, bleeding to death." In another book, his sister is quoted as saying, "He enjoyed telling that story and exaggerating it. He said he saw a dead Indian by the side of the road, and I don't even know if that's true."

Raised a military brat, Morrison spent part of his childhood in San Diego, completed third grade at Fairfax County Elementary School in Virginia, and attended Charles H. Flato Elementary School in Kingsville, Texas, while his father was stationed at NAS Kingsville in 1952. He continued at St. John's Methodist School in Albuquerque, and then Longfellow School Sixth Grade Graduation Program from San Diego.

In 1957, Morrison attended Alameda High School in Alameda, California, for his freshman and first semester of his sophomore year. His family moved back to Virginia in 1959, and he graduated from George Washington High School (now a middle school) in Alexandria in June 1961. While attending George Washington, Morrison maintained a grade average of 88 and tested in the top 0.1% with an IQ of 149.

1961–1963: Literary influences 
A voracious reader from an early age, Morrison was particularly inspired by the writings of several philosophers and poets. He was influenced by Friedrich Nietzsche, whose views on aesthetics, morality, and the Apollonian and Dionysian duality would appear in his conversation, poetry and songs. Some of his formative influences were Plutarch's Parallel Lives and the works of the French Symbolist poet Arthur Rimbaud, whose style would later influence the form of Morrison's short prose poems. He was also influenced by William S. Burroughs, Jack Kerouac, Allen Ginsberg, Louis-Ferdinand Céline, Lawrence Ferlinghetti, Charles Baudelaire, Vladimir Nabokov, Molière, Franz Kafka, Albert Camus, Honoré de Balzac and Jean Cocteau, along with most of the French existentialist philosophers.

Morrison's senior year English teacher later said, "Jim read as much and probably more than any student in class, but everything he read was so offbeat I had another teacher (who was going to the Library of Congress) check to see if the books Jim was reporting on actually existed. I suspected he was making them up, as they were English books on sixteenth- and seventeenth-century demonology. I'd never heard of them, but they existed, and I'm convinced from the paper he wrote that he read them, and the Library of Congress would've been the only source."

Morrison went to live with his paternal grandparents in Clearwater, Florida, and attended St. Petersburg Junior College. In 1962, he transferred to Florida State University (FSU) in Tallahassee and appeared in a school recruitment film. While at FSU, Morrison was arrested for disturbing the peace as well as petty larceny while drunk at a home football game on September 28, 1963.

1964–1965: College experience in Los Angeles 
Morrison soon transferred to the film program at University of California, Los Angeles (UCLA). There he enrolled in Jack Hirschman's class on Antonin Artaud in the university's Comparative Literature program. Artaud's brand of surrealist theatre had a profound impact on Morrison's dark poetic sensibility of cinematic theatricality.

Morrison completed his undergraduate degree at UCLA's film school within the Theater Arts department of the College of Fine Arts in 1965. Refusing to attend the graduation ceremony, he went to Venice Beach, Los Angeles, and the university mailed his diploma to his mother in Coronado, California. He made several short films while attending UCLA. First Love, the first of these films, made with Morrison's classmate and roommate Max Schwartz, was released to the public when it appeared in a documentary about the film Obscura.

During these years, while living in Venice Beach, Morrison befriended writers at the Los Angeles Free Press, for which he advocated until his death in 1971. He conducted a lengthy and in-depth interview with Bob Chorush and Andy Kent, both working for the Free Press at the time (approximately December 6–8, 1970), and was planning on visiting the headquarters of the busy newspaper shortly before leaving for Paris.

1965–1971: The Doors 

In the middle of 1965, after graduating with a bachelor's degree from the UCLA film school, Morrison led a bohemian lifestyle in Venice Beach. Living on the rooftop of a building inhabited by his UCLA classmate, Dennis Jakob, he wrote the lyrics of many of the early songs the Doors would later perform live and record on albums, such as "Moonlight Drive" and "Hello, I Love You". According to fellow UCLA student Ray Manzarek, he lived on canned beans and LSD for several months.

Morrison and Manzarek were the first two members of the Doors, forming the group during that summer. They had met months earlier as cinematography students. Manzarek narrated the story that he was lying on the beach at Venice one day, where he coincidentally encountered Morrison. He was impressed with Morrison's poetic lyrics, claiming that they were "rock group" material. Subsequently, guitarist Robby Krieger and drummer John Densmore joined. Krieger auditioned at Densmore's recommendation and was then added to the lineup. All three musicians shared a common interest in the Maharishi Mahesh Yogi's meditation practices at the time, attending scheduled classes, but Morrison was not involved in these series of classes.

Morrison was inspired to name the band after the title of Aldous Huxley's book The Doors of Perception (a reference to the unlocking of doors of perception through psychedelic drug use). Huxley's own concept was based on a quotation from William Blake's The Marriage of Heaven and Hell, in which Blake wrote: "If the doors of perception were cleansed everything would appear to man as it is, infinite."

Although Morrison was known as the lyricist of the group, Krieger also made lyrical contributions, writing or co-writing some of the group's biggest hits, including "Light My Fire", "Love Me Two Times", "Love Her Madly" and "Touch Me". On the other hand, Morrison, who did not write most songs using an instrument, would come up with vocal melodies for his own lyrics, with the other band members contributing chords and rhythm.  Morrison did not play an instrument live (except for maracas and tambourine for most shows, and harmonica on a few occasions) or in the studio (excluding maracas, tambourine, handclaps, and whistling). However, he did play the grand piano on "Orange County Suite" and a Moog synthesizer on "Strange Days".

In May 1966, Morrison reportedly attended a concert by the Velvet Underground at The Trip in Los Angeles, and Andy Warhol claimed in his book Popism that his "black leather" look had been heavily influenced by the dancer Gerard Malanga  who performed at the concert. In June 1966, Morrison and the Doors were the opening act at the Whisky a Go Go in the last week of the residency of Van Morrison's band Them. Van's influence on Jim's developing stage performance was later noted by Brian Hinton in his book Celtic Crossroads: The Art of Van Morrison: "Jim Morrison learned quickly from his near namesake's stagecraft, his apparent recklessness, his air of subdued menace, the way he would improvise poetry to a rock beat, even his habit of crouching down by the bass drum during instrumental breaks." On the final night, the two Morrisons and their two bands jammed together on "Gloria". Van Morrison later described Jim Morrison as being "really raw. He knew what he was doing and could do it very well."

In November 1966, Morrison and the Doors produced a promotional film for "Break On Through (To the Other Side)", which was their first single release. The film featured the four members of the group playing the song on a darkened set with alternating views and close-ups of the performers while Morrison lip-synched the lyrics. Morrison and the Doors continued to make short music films, including "The Unknown Soldier", "Strange Days" and "People Are Strange".

The Doors achieved national recognition after signing with Elektra Records in 1967. The single "Light My Fire" spent three weeks at number one on the Billboard Hot 100 chart in July/August 1967, a far cry from the Doors opening for Simon and Garfunkel or playing at a high school as they did in Connecticut that same year.

Later in 1967, the Doors appeared on The Ed Sullivan Show, a popular Sunday night variety series that had given the Beatles and Elvis Presley national exposure. Ed Sullivan requested two songs from the Doors for the show, "People Are Strange" and "Light My Fire". Sullivan's censors insisted that the Doors change the lyrics of the song "Light My Fire" from "Girl we couldn't get much higher" to "Girl we couldn't get much better" for the television viewers; this was reportedly due to what was perceived as a reference to drugs in the original lyrics. After giving assurances of compliance to the producer in the dressing room, the band agreed and proceeded to sing the song with the original lyrics. Sullivan was unhappy and refused to shake hands with Morrison or any other band member after their performance. He then had a producer tell the band that they would never appear on his show again, and their planned six further bookings were cancelled. Morrison reportedly said to the producer, in a defiant tone, "Hey man. We just did the Sullivan Show!"

By the release of their second album, Strange Days, the Doors had become one of the most popular rock bands in the U.S. Their blend of blues and dark psychedelic rock included a number of original songs and distinctive cover versions, such as their rendition of "Alabama Song" from Bertolt Brecht and Kurt Weill's opera Rise and Fall of the City of Mahagonny. The band also performed a number of extended concept works, including the songs "The End", "When the Music's Over", and "Celebration of the Lizard". In late Summer 1967, photographer Joel Brodsky took a series of black-and-white photos of Morrison, in a photo shoot known as "The Young Lion" photo session. These photographs are considered among the most iconic images of Jim Morrison and are frequently used as covers for compilation albums, books, and other memorabilia related to Morrison and the Doors.

In late 1967, during a concert in New Haven, Connecticut, Morrison was arrested on stage in an incident that further added to his mystique and emphasized his rebellious image. Prior to the show, a police officer found Morrison and a woman in the showers backstage. Not recognizing the singer, the policeman ordered him to leave, to which Morrison mockingly replied, "Eat me." He was subsequently maced by the officer and the show was delayed. Once onstage, he told the concertgoers an obscenity-filled version of the incident. New Haven police arrested him for indecency and public obscenity, but the charges were later dropped. Morrison was the first rock performer to be arrested onstage.

In 1968, the Doors released their third studio album, Waiting for the Sun. The band performed on July 5 at the Hollywood Bowl. While in Los Angeles, Morrison spent time with Mick Jagger, and the two discussed their mutual hesitation and awkwardness about dancing in front of an audience, with Jagger asking Morrison's advice on "how to work a big crowd". Footage from this performance was later released on the DVD Live at the Hollywood Bowl. On September 6 and 7, 1968, the Doors played in Europe for the first time, with four performances at the Roundhouse in London with Jefferson Airplane which was filmed by Granada Television for the television documentary The Doors Are Open, directed by John Sheppard. Around this time, Morrisonwho had long been a heavy drinkerstarted showing up for recording sessions visibly inebriated. He was also frequently appearing in live performances and studio recordings late or stoned.

By early 1969, the formerly svelte Morrison had gained weight, grown a beard and begun dressing more casually, abandoning the leather pants and concho belts for slacks, jeans, and T-shirts. The Soft Parade, the Doors' fourth album, was released later in that year. It was the first album where each band member was given individual songwriting credit, by name, for their work. Previously, each song on their albums had been credited simply to "The Doors".

During a concert on March 1, 1969, at the Dinner Key Auditorium in Miami, Morrison attempted to spark a riot in the audience, in part by screaming, "You wanna see my cock?" and other obscenities. Three days later, six warrants for his arrest were issued by the Dade County Public Safety Department for indecent exposure, among other accusations. Consequently, many of the Doors' scheduled concerts were canceled. On September 20, 1970, Morrison was convicted of indecent exposure and profanity by a six-person jury in Miami after a sixteen-day trial. Morrison, who attended the October 30 sentencing "in a wool jacket adorned with Indian designs", silently listened as he was sentenced to six months in prison and had to pay a $500 fine. Morrison remained free on a $50,000 bond. At the sentencing, Judge Murray Goodman told Morrison that he was a "person graced with a talent" admired by many of his peers.

Interviewed by Boc Chorush of the L.A. Free Press, Morrison expressed both bafflement and clarity about the Miami incident:

On December 8, 2010the 67th anniversary of Morrison's birth Florida governor Charlie Crist and the state clemency board unanimously signed a complete posthumous pardon for Morrison. All the other members of the band, along with Doors' road manager Vince Treanor, have denied the notion that Morrison ever exposed himself on stage that night.

Following The Soft Parade, the Doors released Morrison Hotel. After a lengthy break, the group reconvened in October 1970 to record their final album with Morrison, titled L.A. Woman. Shortly after the recording sessions for the album began, producer Paul A. Rothchildwho had overseen all of their previous recordingsleft the project, and engineer Bruce Botnick took over as producer.

Death 

After recording L.A. Woman with the Doors in Los Angeles, Morrison announced to the band his intention to go to Paris. His bandmates generally felt it was a good idea. In March 1971, he joined girlfriend Pamela Courson in Paris at an apartment she had rented at 17–19, Rue Beautreillis in Le Marais, 4th arrondissement. In letters to friends, he described going for long walks through the city alone. During this time, he shaved his beard and lost some of the weight he had gained in the previous months.

On July 3, 1971, Morrison was found dead in the bathtub of the apartment at approximately 6:00 a.m. by Courson. He was 27 years old. The official cause of death was listed as heart failure, although no autopsy was performed as it was not required by French law. Several individuals who say they were eyewitnesses claim that his death was due to an accidental heroin overdose; however this has never been confirmed. According to music journalist Ben Fong-Torres, it was suggested that his death was kept a secret and the reporters who had telephoned to Paris were told that Morrison was not deceased but tired and resting at a hospital.

Morrison's death came two years to the day after the death of Rolling Stones guitarist Brian Jones and approximately nine months after the deaths of Jimi Hendrix and Janis Joplin. All of these popular musicians died at the age of 27, leading to the emergence of the 27 Club urban legend. Since the date of his demise, there have been a number of conspiracy theories concerning Morrison's death.

Personal life

Morrison's family 

Morrison's early life was the semi-nomadic existence typical of military families. Jerry Hopkins recorded Morrison's brother, Andy, explaining that his parents had determined never to use corporal punishment such as spanking on their children. They instead instilled discipline by the military tradition known as "dressing down", which consisted of yelling at and berating the children until they were reduced to tears and acknowledged their failings. Once Morrison graduated from UCLA, he broke off most contact with his family. By the time his music ascended to the top of the charts (in 1967) he had not been in communication with his family for more than a year and falsely claimed that everyone in his immediate family was dead (or claimed, as it has been widely misreported, that he was an only child). However, Morrison told Hopkins in a 1969 interview for Rolling Stone magazine that he did this because he did not want to involve his family in his musical career.

Morrison's father was not supportive of his career choice in music. One day, an acquaintance brought over a record thought to have Morrison on the cover, which was the Doors' debut album. Upon hearing the record, Morrison's father wrote him a letter telling him "to give up any idea of singing or any connection with a music group because of what I consider to be a complete lack of talent in this direction." In a letter to the Florida Probation and Parole Commission District Office dated October 2, 1970, Morrison's father acknowledged the breakdown in family communications as the result of an argument over his assessment of his son's musical talents. He said he could not blame his son for being reluctant to initiate contact and that he was proud of him.

Morrison spoke fondly of his Irish and Scottish ancestry and was inspired by Celtic mythology in his poetry and songs. Celtic Family Magazine revealed in its 2016 Spring Issue that his Morrison clan was originally from the Isle of Lewis in Scotland, while his Irish side, the Clelland clan who married into the Morrison line, were from County Down in Northern Ireland.

Relationships 
Morrison was sought after by many as a photographer's model, confidant, romantic partner and sexual conquest. He had several serious relationships and many casual encounters. By many accounts, he could also be inconsistent with his partners, displaying what some recall as "a dual personality". Rothchild recalls, "Jim really was two very distinct and different people. A Jekyll and Hyde. When he was sober, he was Jekyll, the most erudite, balanced, friendly kind of guy... He was Mr. America. When he would start to drink, he'd be okay at first, then, suddenly, he would turn into a maniac. Turn into Hyde."

One of Morrison's early significant relationships was with Mary Werbelow, whom he met on the beach in Clearwater, Florida, when they were teenagers in the summer of 1962. In a 2005 interview with the St. Petersburg Times, she said Morrison spoke to her before a photo shoot for the Doors' fourth album and told her the first three albums were about her. She also stated in the interview that she was not a fan of the band and never attended a concert by them. Werbelow broke off the relationship in Los Angeles in the summer of 1965, a few months before Morrison began rehearsals. Manzarek said of Werbelow, "She was Jim's first love. She held a deep place in his soul." Manzarek also noted that Morrison's song "The End" was intended originally to be "a short goodbye love song to Mary," with the longer oedipal middle section a later addition.

Morrison spent the majority of his adult life in an open and at times very charged and intense relationship with Pamela Courson. Through to the end, Courson saw Morrison as more than a rock star, as "a great poet"; she constantly encouraged him and pushed him to write. Courson attended his concerts and focused on supporting his career. Like Morrison, she was described by many as fiery, determined and attractive, as someone who was tough despite appearing fragile. Manzarek called Pamela "Jim's other half" and said, "I never knew another person who could so complement his bizarreness."

After her death in 1974, Courson was buried by her family as Pamela Susan Morrison, despite the two having never been married. Her parents petitioned the court for inheritance of Morrison's estate. The probate court in California decided that she and Morrison had once had what qualified as a common-law marriage, despite neither having applied for such status and the common-law marriage not being recognized in California. Morrison's will at the time of his death named Courson as the sole heir.

Morrison dedicated his published poetry books The Lords and New Creatures and the lost writings Wilderness to Courson. A number of writers have speculated that songs like "Love Street", "Orange County Suite" and "Queen of the Highway", among other songs, may have been written about her. Though the relationship was "tumultuous" much of the time, and both also had relationships with others, they always maintained a unique and ongoing connection with one another until the end of Morrison's life.

Throughout his career, Morrison had regular sexual and romantic encounters with fans (including groupies) such as Pamela Des Barres, as well as ongoing affairs with other musicians, writers, and photographers involved in the music business. They included Nico; singer Grace Slick of Jefferson Airplane; and editor Gloria Stavers of 16 Magazine, as well as an alleged alcohol-fueled encounter with Janis Joplin. David Crosby stated many years later that Morrison treated Joplin cruelly at a party at the Calabasas, California, home of John Davidson while Davidson was out of town. She reportedly hit him over the head with a bottle of whiskey during a fight in front of witnesses, and thereafter referred to Morrison as "that asshole" whenever his name was brought up in conversation.

As first written about in No One Here Gets Out Alive, Break On Through, and later in her own memoir, Strange Days: My Life With and Without Jim Morrison, Morrison participated in a Celtic Pagan handfasting ceremony with rock critic Patricia Kennealy. The couple signed a handwritten document, and were declared wed by a Celtic High Priestess and High Priest on Midsummer night in 1970, but none of the necessary paperwork for a legal marriage was filed with the state.

After meeting at a private interview for Jazz & Pop magazine in January 1969, Morrison and Kennealy had developed a friendship which soon evolved into a long-distance relationship. The handfasting ceremony is described in No One Here Gets Out Alive as a "blending of souls on a karmic and cosmic plane". Morrison was also still seeing Courson when he was in Los Angeles, and later moved to Paris for the summer, where Courson had acquired an apartment. In an interview for the book Rock Wives, Kennealy says he turned "really cold" when she unintentionally became pregnant, leading her to speculate that maybe he hadn't taken the wedding as seriously as he'd led her to believe. Kennealy also ties this coldness to his trial in Miami, stating that "he was scared to death. They were really out to put him away. Jim was devastated that he wasn't getting any public support."

As he did with so many people, Morrison could be cruel and cold and then turn warm and loving; he wrote in letters that he was planning on returning to Kennealy in New York City in the fall of 1971. However, Kennealy was skeptical; he was living with Courson in Paris, he was drinking heavily and in poor health, and Kennealy, like many, feared he was dying.

At the time of Morrison's death, there were thirty-seven paternity actions pending against him, although no claims were made against his estate by any of the putative paternity claimants.

Artistic influences 

Although Morrison's early education was routinely disrupted as he moved from school to school, he was drawn to the study of literature, poetry, religion, philosophy and psychology, among other fields. Biographers have consistently pointed to a number of writers and philosophers who influenced his thinking and, perhaps, his behaviour. While still in his adolescence, Morrison discovered the works of German philosopher Friedrich Nietzsche.

Morrison was drawn to the poetry of William Blake, Arthur Rimbaud and Charles Baudelaire. Beat Generation writers such as Jack Kerouac and libertine writers such as the Marquis de Sade also had a strong influence on Morrison's outlook and manner of expression; he was eager to experience the life described in Kerouac's On the Road. He was similarly drawn to the work of French writer Louis-Ferdinand Céline. Céline's book, Voyage Au Bout de la Nuit (Journey to the End of the Night) and Blake's Auguries of Innocence both echo through one of Morrison's early songs, "End of the Night".

Morrison later met and befriended Michael McClure, a well-known Beat poet. McClure had enjoyed Morrison's lyrics but was even more impressed by his poetry and encouraged him to further develop his craft. Morrison's vision of performance was colored by the works of 20th-century French playwright Antonin Artaud (author of Theater and its Double) and by Judith Malina and Julian Beck's Living Theater.

Other works relating to religion, mysticism, ancient myth and symbolism were of lasting interest to Morrison, particularly Joseph Campbell's The Hero with a Thousand Faces. James Frazer's The Golden Bough also became a source of inspiration and is reflected in the title and lyrics of the song "Not to Touch the Earth". Morrison was particularly attracted to the myths and religions of Native American cultures.

While he was still at school, his family moved to New Mexico where he became familiar with the landscape and some of the iconography important to the Indigenous peoples of the American Southwest. These interests appear to be the source of many references to creatures and places such as lizards, snakes, deserts and "ancient lakes" that appear in his songs and poetry. His interpretations and fantasies of Native American ceremonies and ceremonial leaders (which, based on his readings, he referred to by the anthropological term "shamans") influenced his stage performances, notably in his seeking of trance states and vision through dancing to the point of exhaustion. In particular, Morrison's poem "The Ghost Song" was inspired by his readings about the Native American Ghost Dance.

Morrison's vocal influences included Elvis Presley and Frank Sinatra, which can be heard in his baritone crooning style on several of the Doors' songs. In the 1981 documentary The Doors: A Tribute to Jim Morrison, Rothchild relates his first impression of Morrison as being a "Rock and Roll Bing Crosby". Botnick has recalled that when he first met the Doors in Sunset Sound Studios he showed them the condenser microphone, which Morrison would then use when recording his vocals for their debut album. Morrison was particularly excited about this microphone (the Telefunken U47) as it was the same model that Sinatra had used for some of his recording sessions. Sugerman has written that Morrison, as a teenager, was such a fan of Elvis that he demanded silence when Elvis was on the radio, but that Sinatra was Morrison's favorite singer. According to record producer David Anderle, Morrison considered Brian Wilson "his favorite musician" and the Beach Boys' 1967 LP Wild Honey "one of his favorite albums. ... he really got into it."

Wallace Fowlie, professor emeritus of French literature at Duke University, wrote Rimbaud and Jim Morrison, subtitled "The Rebel as PoetA Memoir". In this, he recounts his surprise at receiving a fan letter from Morrison who, in 1968, thanked him for his latest translation of Rimbaud's verse into English. "I don't read French easily", he wrote, "...your book travels around with me." Fowlie went on to give lectures on numerous campuses comparing the lives, philosophies, and poetry of Morrison and Rimbaud. The book The Doors, by the remaining Doors, quotes Morrison's close friend Frank Lisciandro as saying that too many people took a remark of Morrison's that he was interested in revolt, disorder, and chaos "to mean that he was an anarchist, a revolutionary, or, worse yet, a nihilist. Hardly anyone noticed that Jim was paraphrasing Rimbaud and the Surrealist poets".

Poetry and film 
Morrison began writing in earnest during his adolescence. At UCLA he studied the related fields of theater, film, and cinematography. He self-published two volumes of poetry in 1969, titled The Lords / Notes on Vision and The New Creatures. The Lords consists primarily of brief descriptions of places, people, events and Morrison's thoughts on cinema. The New Creatures verses are more poetic in structure, feel and appearance. These two books were later combined into a single volume titled The Lords and The New Creatures. These were the only writings published during Morrison's lifetime. Morrison befriended Beat poet Michael McClure, who wrote the afterword for Hopkins' No One Here Gets Out Alive. McClure and Morrison reportedly collaborated on a number of unmade film projects, including a film version of McClure's infamous play The Beard, in which Morrison would have played Billy the Kid.

The Lost Writings of Jim Morrison Volume I is titled Wilderness, and, upon its release in 1988, became an instant New York Times Bestseller. Volume II, The American Night, released in 1990, was also a success. Morrison recorded his own poetry in a professional sound studio on two occasions. The first was in March 1969 in Los Angeles and the second was on December 8, 1970. The latter recording session was attended by Morrison's personal friends and included a variety of sketch pieces. Some of the segments from the 1969 session were issued on the bootleg album The Lost Paris Tapes and were later used as part of The Doors' An American Prayer album, released in 1978. The album reached No. 54 on the music charts.

Some poetry recorded from the December 1970 session remains unreleased to this day and is in the possession of the Courson family. Morrison's best-known but seldom seen cinematic endeavor is HWY: An American Pastoral, a project he started in 1969. Morrison financed the venture and formed his own production company in order to maintain complete control of the project. Paul Ferrara, Frank Lisciandro, and Babe Hill assisted with the project. Morrison played the main character, a hitchhiker turned killer/car thief. Morrison asked his friend, composer/pianist Fred Myrow, to select the soundtrack for the film.

Paris Journal 
After his death, a notebook of poetry written by Morrison was recovered, titled Paris Journal; amongst other personal details, it contains the allegorical foretelling of a man who will be left grieving and having to abandon his belongings, due to a police investigation into a death connected to the Chinese opium trade. "Weeping, he left his pad on orders from police and furnishings hauled away, all records and mementos, and reporters calculating tears & curses for the press: 'I hope the Chinese junkies get you' and they will for the [opium] poppy rules the world".

The concluding stanzas of this poem convey disappointment for someone with whom he had had an intimate relationship and contain a further invocation of Billy the killer/Hitchhiker, a common character in Morrison's body of work. "This is my poem for you, Great flowing funky flower'd beast, Great perfumed wreck of hell... Someone new in your knickers & who would that be? You know, You know more, than you let on... Tell them you came & saw & look'd into my eyes & saw the shadow of the guard receding, Thoughts in time & out of season The Hitchhiker stood by the side of the road & levelled his thumb in the calm calculus of reason."

In 2013, another of Morrison's notebooks from Paris, found alongside the Paris Journal in the same box, known as the 127 Fascination box, sold for $250,000 at auction. This box of personal belongings similarly contained a home movie of Pamela Courson dancing in an unspecified cemetery in Corsica, the only film so far recovered to have been filmed by Morrison. The box also housed a number of older notebooks and journals and may initially have included the "Steno Pad" and the falsely titled The Lost Paris Tapes bootleg, if they had not been separated from the primary collection and sold by Philippe Dalecky with this promotional title. Those familiar with the voices of Morrison's friends and colleagues later determined that, contrary to the story advanced by Dalecky that this was Morrison's final recording made with busking Parisian musicians, the Lost Paris Tapes are in fact of "Jomo & The Smoothies": Morrison, friend Michael McClure and producer Paul Rothchild loose jamming in Los Angeles, well before Paris 1971.

Grave site 

Morrison was buried in Père Lachaise Cemetery in Paris, one of the city's most visited tourist attractions, where Irish playwright Oscar Wilde, French cabaret singer Édith Piaf, and many other poets and artists are also buried. The grave had no official marker until French officials placed a shield over it, which was stolen in 1973. The grave was listed in the cemetery directory with Morrison's name incorrectly arranged as "Douglas James Morrison".

In 1981, Croatian sculptor Mladen Mikulin voluntarilywith the approval of the cemetery curatorsplaced a marble bust of his own design and a new gravestone with Morrison's name at the grave to commemorate the tenth anniversary of Morrison's death; the bust was defaced through the years by vandals and later stolen in 1988. Mikulin made another bust of Morrison in 1989 and a bronze portrait ("death mask") of him in 2001; neither piece is at the gravesite.

In 1990, Morrison's father, George Stephen Morrison, after a consultation with E. Nicholas Genovese, Professor of Classics and Humanities, San Diego State University, placed a flat stone on the grave. The bronze plaque thereon bears the Greek inscription: ΚΑΤΑ ΤΟΝ ΔΑΙΜΟΝΑ ΕΑΥΤΟΥ, usually translated as "true to his own spirit" or "according to his own daemon".

Legacy

Musical 
Morrison was and continues to be one of the most popular and influential singer-songwriters and iconic frontmen in rock history. To this day, he is widely regarded as the prototypical rock star: surly, sexy, scandalous, and mysterious. The leather pants he was fond of wearing both onstage and off have since become stereotyped as rock-star apparel. The lead singer of U2, Bono, had used Morrison's leather pants for his onstage alter-ego, which he called "Fly". Music journalist Stephen Davis described Morrison as the single "greatest American rock star of his era".

In 1993, Morrison was inducted into the Rock and Roll Hall of Fame as a member of the Doors. In 2011, a Rolling Stone readers' pick placed Morrison in fifth place of the magazine's "Best Lead Singers of All Time". In another Rolling Stone list, entitled "The 100 Greatest Singers of All Time", he was ranked 47th. He was also ranked number 22 on Classic Rock magazine's "50 Greatest Singers in Rock".

Fatboy Slim's song "Sunset" includes Morrison's vocal interpretation of his poem "Bird of Prey". In 2012, electronic music producer Skrillex released "Breakn' a Sweat" which contained vocals from an interview with Morrison. Alice Cooper has said that his song "Desperado", from the 1971 Killer, was dedicated to Morrison.

Influences 
Iggy and the Stooges are said to have formed after lead singer Iggy Pop was inspired by Morrison while attending a Doors concert in Ann Arbor, Michigan. Pop later said about the concert:

One of Pop's most popular songs, "The Passenger", is said to be based on one of Morrison's poems. Layne Staley, the vocalist of Alice in Chains; Eddie Vedder, the vocalist of Pearl Jam; Scott Weiland, the vocalist of Stone Temple Pilots and Velvet Revolver; Glenn Danzig, singer and founder of Danzig; Ian Astbury, the frontman of the Cult; Siouxsie Sioux, the lead singer of Siouxsie and the Banshees; Ian Curtis, the lead singer of Joy Division; Billy Idol, and Patti Smith  have said that Morrison was their biggest influence. Music journalist Simon Reynolds noted that Morrison's "deep, heavy alloys" served as a prototype for the gothic rock scene.

Films

Biopic 

In 1991, Oliver Stone directed a biopic film about Morrison, with actor Val Kilmer portraying him. Kilmer learned over twenty of the Doors' songs to achieve Morrison's role. While the film was inspired by many real events and individuals, the film's depiction of Morrison was heavily criticized by many people who knew him personally, including Patricia Kennealy and the other Doors members. Manzarek said about the film's portrayal, "It was ridiculous... It was not about Jim Morrison. It was about 'Jimbo Morrison', the drunk. God, where was the sensitive poet and the funny guy? The guy I knew was not on that screen." Krieger agreed that the movie didn't capture "how Jim [Morrison] was at all." He also noted the impact of the film's representation on numerous people he talked to: "He's never a real guy in that movie. People find it hard to believe he could just be a normal person–a good friend and a great guy to be with."

On an album by CPR, David Crosby wrote and recorded a song about the movie with the lyric: "And I have seen that movieand it wasn't like that." In general, the film received underwhelming to poor reviews, which largely focused on the many inaccuracies and problems with the narrative. However, Kilmer received some praise for his performance, with some members of the Doors reportedly saying that at times they couldn't distinguish whether it was Kilmer or Morrison singing on some of the sequences. Overall, the group members praised Kilmer's interpretation. Regardless of the widespread acclaim surrounding Kilmer's performance, he did not claim any award.

Others 
The lead character of a 2011 Bollywood film, Rockstar starring Ranbir Kapoor, was inspired by Morrison. The 2007 film Walk Hard: The Dewey Cox Story has numerous references to Morrison.

Discography

The Doors 
 The Doors (1967)
 Strange Days (1967)
 Waiting for the Sun (1968)
 The Soft Parade (1969)
 Morrison Hotel (1970)
 L.A. Woman (1971)
 An American Prayer (1978)

Filmography

Films by Morrison 
 HWY: An American Pastoral

Documentaries featuring Morrison 

 The Doors Are Open (1968)
 Live in Europe (1968)
 Live at the Hollywood Bowl (1968)
 Feast of Friends (1970)
 The Doors: A Tribute to Jim Morrison (1981)
 The Doors: Dance on Fire (1985)
 The Soft Parade, a Retrospective (1991)
 The Doors: No One Here Gets Out Alive (2001)
 Final 24: Jim Morrison (2007), The Biography Channel
 When You're Strange (2009), Won the Grammy Award for Best Long Form Video in 2011.
 Rock Poet: Jim Morrison (2010)
 Morrison's Mustang – A Vision Quest to Find The Blue Lady (2011, in production)
 Mr. Mojo Risin': The Story of L.A. Woman (2011)
 The Doors Live at the Bowl '68 (2012)
 The Doors: R-Evolution (2013)
 Feast of Friends (2014)
 Danny Says (2016)
 Live at the Isle of Wight Festival 1970 (2018)

Bibliography 
 The Lords and the New Creatures (1969). 1985 edition: 
 An American Prayer (1970) privately printed by Western Lithographers. (Unauthorized edition also published in 1983, Zeppelin Publishing Company, . The authenticity of the unauthorized edition has been disputed.)
 Arden lointain, edition bilingue (1988), trad. de l'américain et présenté par Sabine Prudent et Werner Reimann. [Paris]: C. Bourgois. 157 p. N.B.: Original texts in English, with French translations, on facing pages. 
 Wilderness: The Lost Writings Of Jim Morrison (1988). 1990 edition: 
 The American Night: The Writings of Jim Morrison (1990). 1991 edition: 
 The Collected Works of Jim Morrison: Poetry, Journals, Transcripts, and Lyrics (2021). Edited by Frank Lisciandro, Foreword by Tom Robbins: 
 Stephen Davis, Jim Morrison: Life, Death, Legend, (2004) 
 John Densmore, Riders on the Storm: My Life With Jim Morrison and The Doors (1991)

References

Further reading 
 Linda Ashcroft, Wild Child: Life with Jim Morrison, (1997) 
 Lester Bangs, "Jim Morrison: Bozo Dionysus a Decade Later" in Main Lines, Blood Feasts, and Bad Taste: A Lester Bangs Reader, John Morthland, ed. Anchor Press (2003) 
 Dave DiMartino, Moonlight Drive (1995) 
 Steven Erkel, "The Poet Behind The Doors: Jim Morrison's Poetry and the 1960s Countercultural Movement" (2011)
 Wallace Fowlie, Rimbaud and Jim Morrison (1994) 
 Jerry Hopkins, The Lizard King: The Essential Jim Morrison (1995) 
 Jerry Hopkins and Danny Sugerman, No One Here Gets Out Alive (1980) 
 Huddleston, Judy, Love Him Madly: An Intimate Memoir of Jim Morrison (2013) 
 Mike Jahn, "Jim Morrison and The Doors", (1969) Library of Congress Catalog Card Number 71-84745
 Dylan Jones, Jim Morrison: Dark Star, (1990) 
 Patricia Kennealy, Strange Days: My Life With and Without Jim Morrison (1992) 
 Gerry Kirstein, "Some Are Born to Endless Night: Jim Morrison, Visions of Apocalypse and Transcendence" (2012) 
 Frank Lisciandro, Morrison: A Feast of Friends (1991) , MorrisonUn festin entre amis (1996) (French)
 Frank Lisciandro, Jim Morrison: An Hour For Magic (A Photojournal) (1982) , James Douglas Morrison (2005) (French)
 Ray Manzarek, Light My Fire (1998) . First by Jerry Hopkins and Danny Sugerman (1981)
 Peter Jan Margry, The Pilgrimage to Jim Morrison's Grave at Père Lachaise Cemetery: The Social Construction of Sacred Space. In idem (ed.), Shrines and Pilgrimage in the Modern World. New Itineraries into the Sacred. Amsterdam University Press, 2008, p. 145–173.
 Thanasis Michos, The Poetry of James Douglas Morrison (2001)  (Greek)
 Daveth Milton, We Want The World: Jim Morrison, The Living Theatre, and the FBI, (2012) 
 Mark Opsasnick, The Lizard King Was Here: The Life and Times of Jim Morrison in Alexandria, Virginia (2006) 
 James Riordan & Jerry Prochnicky, Break on through: The Life and Death of Jim Morrison (1991) 
 Adriana Rubio, Jim Morrison: Ceremony...Exploring the Shaman Possession (2005) ISBN
 Howard Sounes. 27: A History of the 27 Club Through the Lives of Brian Jones, Jimi Hendrix, Janis Joplin, Jim Morrison, Kurt Cobain, and Amy Winehouse, Boston: Da Capo Press, 2013. .
 The Doors (remaining members Ray Manzarek, Robby Krieger, John Densmore) with Ben Fong-Torres, The Doors (2006) 
 Mick Wall, "Love Becomes a Funeral Pyre: A Biography of The Doors", (2014)

External links 

 
 The Doors official website
 
 
 Earliest film of Jim Morrison
 A lost painting collaboration with Jim Morrison intended for his An American Prayer album
 George Washington High School Alumni Association, Alexandria, Va., Morrison page

 
1943 births
1971 deaths
20th-century American poets
20th-century American male singers
20th-century American singers
20th-century American male writers
American baritones
American expatriates in France
American male film actors
American male poets
American male singer-songwriters
American people of English descent
American people of Irish descent
American people of Scottish descent
American rock singers
American rock songwriters
Psychedelic rock musicians
Burials at Père Lachaise Cemetery
Columbia Records artists
Death conspiracy theories
The Doors members
Elektra Records artists
Florida State University alumni
Musicians from Alexandria, Virginia
Obscenity controversies in music
People from Melbourne, Florida
People from Topanga, California
People who have received posthumous pardons
Recipients of American gubernatorial pardons
Singer-songwriters from Florida
UCLA Film School alumni
People from Laurel Canyon, Los Angeles
Singer-songwriters from Virginia
Singer-songwriters from California